Lee Friedlander (born in Connecticut) is an American film director, screenwriter and producer.

Filmography

See also
 List of female film and television directors
 List of lesbian filmmakers
 List of LGBT-related films directed by women
 List of Jewish film directors

References

External links
 
 
 Lee Friedlander interview, AfterEllen (2019)

Living people
Year of birth missing (living people)
American television directors
American women film directors
American women screenwriters
LGBT film directors
LGBT producers
American LGBT screenwriters
American women television directors
Film directors from Connecticut
LGBT television directors
21st-century American women